Royston Town Football Club (also known as the Crows) are an English football club based in Royston, Hertfordshire, England, and have played their home games at Garden Walk since 1932.

Founded in 1875, it is the third oldest club in Hertfordshire, behind Hitchin Town and Bishop's Stortford. They reached the fifth round of the FA Vase in 2009–10 for the first time in their history, and the fourth qualifying round of the FA Cup in 2019–20, losing to Maldon & Tiptree in front of a record crowd of 1,152 at Garden Walk. The Crows also reached the quarter final of the Buildbase FA Trophy in 2019–20 losing to eventual finalists Concord Rangers.

The current first team manager is former St Albans City boss Steve Castle who arrived at the club in 2013.

History
Royston Town, nicknamed "The Crows", was formed in 1875 and are the third oldest club in Hertfordshire. One of the first traces of the club was in October 1875 when Royston visited Saffron Walden. The game was played at Saffron Walden Common. This game was re-lived in October 1975 to celebrate the Essex club's centenary year.

After this, there was a period up to the early 1900s when little was known about the club's history but just before the Great War (1914–18) it is known that there were two clubs in existence, the other club being known as the 'Non-Cons', short for Non-Conformists.

After the First World War, the club entered the Buntingford & District League and in 1921, when the club was affiliated to the Cambs F.A. they won the Creake Shield.

The club's first major honour came in the guise of the Herts County Premier League title in 1969–70 and they repeated the feat in 1972–73 and 1976–77. In 1978 they rejoined the South Midlands League and won the Division One title for the first time of asking. Success continued with a Cup Final appearance in the Herts Charity Shield for the first time in 1979 and runners up spot in the South Midlands League Premier Division in 1980. The Herts Charity Shield was won in 1981–82 and two years later the club joined the Isthmian League Division Two North were they remained for six years. One of the legacies of their spell in the Isthmian League is the stand at Garden Walk, positioned mid-way along the far touchline on the cemetery side of the ground. Erected in 1984, it replaced an earlier timber structure and is constructed largely from brick with a sloping metal roof supported by ten posts. The official seated capacity is 300, although this is largely on benches, with only a modest number of seats provided in the central portion.

In 1990 the club lifted the Herts Charity Shield again with a 1–0 defeat of Pirton. However, after a bright start to the following season, the club dropped from 6th place to 16th. As a result, were relegated to Division Three where they remained until resigning from the Isthmian League at the end of the 1993–94 season despite finishing 8th spot. The club had never been particularly well supported and was instructed to construct a new stand behind the dugouts opposite the existing stand at an estimated £20,000. Rather than comply with the ruling, Royston resigned from the Isthmian League after ten seasons. It was during this season that the club achieved its highest official attendance of 876 with the visit of Aldershot Town.

The resignation meant a return to the South Midlands League for 1994–95 season and with Tony Galvin in charge not only did the club finish in a creditable 4th place, but they also captured the South Midlands League Floodlight Cup with a 2–1 defeat of Sawbridgeworth Town. The following season saw a 6th-place finish and the departure of Tony Galvin. Paddy Butcher took over as player/manager having returned to the club from Ware. Prior to going to Ware, he had played for the Crows for over seven seasons and was the leading goalscorer in all of them.

In 1996–97 the club finished 6th in the league again and won the Herts Charity Shield for the third time. 1997–98 saw the club finish 4th in the Premier Division, but concluded with the departure of Paddy Butcher.

They kicked off the 1998–99 with a new manager and coach partnership, Kevin Pugh and Sam Salamone who had steered Standon & Puckeridge to a 17-point winning margin in the 1997–98 Herts County League Division One. However, after a disappointing season in 2000–01 the Crows saw the departure of Pugh and Salamone. With a first-team coach, Gavin Head taking over the mantle of manager for the 2001–02 season, aided by a backroom staff of Tony Faulkner (first-team coach) and Paul Attfield (reserve and youth Team Manager), the first team finished eighth in the Premier Division. However, following the resignation of Gavin Head in October 2002, the first team manager's position was taken up by Peter Theo.

In March 2003, Peter Baker, ex-youth and reserve team manager and former Herts County under-18s manager, became first team manager. Baker continued the following season with a completely new management team of Mark Saggers (assistant manager), Brian Cannon (coach), Tyronne Parry (reserve team manager) and Billy Jones (youth team manager).

Having built a firm base of local talent, Peter Baker stood down as manager during the close season, and the position of first team manager for the 2005–06 season was taken up jointly by Mark Saggers and Brian Cannon. Tyronne Parry continued to run the reserve team in a bid to restore their Division 1 status, with the youth team being run by new managers Kevin Wilson and John Bloss. After a poor 2005–06 season, with the Crows, narrowly avoiding relegation, Saggers and Cannon left the club.

The Crows started the 2006–07 season with yet another new manager, Phil Snowden, who had been First Team Coach under Paddy Butcher up until the end of the 1997–98 season, followed by a period of coaching at Enfield Town. The reserves continued to be run by Tyronne Parry, and Kevin Wilson and John Bloss stepped up to restart a Royston Town 'A' side playing out of Barkway in the K.B. Tyres and Mercury League. The youth team was managed by Stewart McDonald and coached by former club goalkeeper Simon Dobson. However, after another inconsistent season, the Crows were relegated to Spartan South Midlands League Division One. Despite this setback, the Committee decided to keep faith with the management team.

However, after a poor run of league results, Snowden resigned in November 2007 and was replaced by Paul Attfield from Buntingford Town with Tony Galvin returning to Garden Walk as first team coach. Also in November reserve team manager Tyronne Parry resigned leaving Royston Town 'A' managers Kevin Wilson and John Bloss to step up a level. Chairman Graham Phillips stood down as he felt the time was right after nearly ten years at the helm and was replaced by Robert Stewart, owner of Stevenage Packaging Ltd. Within a fortnight of arriving, Royston Town had signed their first player for a fee in their history, in the form of former youth and first team player, Craig Hammond from Mildenhall Town for an undisclosed fee. At the end of January 2008, Rob Stewart had to resign due to work commitments. For the 2008–09 season former Town favourite Duncan Easley was appointed Paul Attfield's assistant manager. Steve Jackson was unveiled as the club's new chairman at the end of August. Attfield resigned due to ill health on 5 November 2013.

The South Midlands Division One championship was secured in the 2008/09 season and three years later a further promotion was secured in the 2011/12 season. Six other cups were won in the same period with the South Midlands Floodlit Cup won four seasons in a row.

Stadium

Garden Walk has been the home of Royston Town F.C. since 1932. The clubhouse and dressing rooms are behind the near goal and were constructed in 1974, while the floodlights were switched on in 1981. One of the legacies of their spell in the Isthmian League is the stand at Garden Walk, positioned mid-way along the far touchline on the cemetery side of the ground. Erected in 1984, it replaced an earlier timber structure and is constructed largely from brick with a sloping metal roof supported by ten posts. The official seated capacity is 300, although this is largely on benches, with only a modest number of seats provided in the central portion. Although rather hemmed in by housing, Garden Walk is certainly a better County League ground. Opportunities for development however are limited and the club have been seeking an alternative home for some time. However, in the spring of 2004 the club were rocked by the news that although they had won support at local council level, planning permission for a new ground at Ivy Farm had been turned down by the Government Office for the East of England.
In 2017-18 three new stands were erected at Garden Walk. Two all seater and one standing only.

Supporters

The Royston Town F.C. Supporters' Club has over 100 members that are regulars down Garden Walk. The attendances have been steadily rising since Steve Castle became manager from crowds of 20 to crowds of 300 - 400.

Players

Current squad
 

The Southern Football League does not use a squad numbering system.

Officials
President: Alan Barlow
Chairman: Steve Jackson
Secretary: Terry McKinnell
Treasurer: Geoff Gill
Football Fixture Secretary (Seniors): Steve Endacott
Programme Editor: Angela Baulk
Website Editor: Steve Endacott
Executive Committee: Andy Toovey, Eric Joyce, Chris Coote, Duncan Easley, Neil MacLeod, David Baulk, Matt Clowery
Youth Football Rep: Giles Parnwell

Management team

Managerial history

Honours
Winners: 
2016–17 – Southern League Division One Central
1929–30 – Cambridgeshire League Division 2
1969–70 – Herts County League (Div 1)
1972–73 – Herts County League (Div 1)
1976–77 – Herts County League (Premier Div)
1977–78 – South Midlands League (Div 1)
1978–79 – South Midlands Reserve League (Div 2) and North Herts (Div IV) League Cup
1979–80 – South Midlands Reserve League (Div 1) and North Herts (Div IV) League Cup
1981–82 – Herts Charity Shield
1988–89 – Herts Intermediate Cup and Televised Sports League
1989–90 – Chiltern Youth League (Div 1) and Herts Charity Shield
1992–93 – South Combinations Reserve Floodlight Cup and Chiltern Youth League Cup
1994–95 – South Midlands Floodlit Cup
1995–96 – South Midlands Challenge Trophy
1996–97 – Herts Charity Shield
1998–99 – Eastern Region Women's League (Div 2)
2001–02 – Eastern Counties Youth League Cup
2006–07 – K.B. Tyres Division 3 Champions
2008–09 – South Midlands Division One Champions and Division One League Cup Winners, South Midlands Reserve Division Two East Champions and Reserve League Challenge Cup Winners
2008–09 – South Midlands Floodlit Cup
2009–10 – South Midlands Floodlit Cup and South Midlands Floodlit Reserve Cup
2010–11 – South Midlands Floodlit Cup
2011–12 – South Midlands Premier Division Winners. South Midlands Premier Division Cup Winners, South Midlands Floodlit Cup
2012–13 - Hinchingbrooke Cup (Joint Winners with Yaxley FC), Suburban Reserve League North Division Champions

Runners-Up:
1978–79 – South Midlands Challenge Cup and Herts Charity Shield
1979–80 – South Midlands League (Prem Div) and North Herts (Div IV)
1981–82 – North Herts (Div III)
1982–83 – North Herts (Div II) and South Midlands Reserve Section Trophy
1986–87 – Chiltern Youth League Cup
1992–93 – Herts County Youth Cup
1993–94 – North Herts (Div 1)
1995–96 – South Midlands Floodlit Cup
1998–99 – Herts Charity Shield and Herts F.A. Women's Cup
1999–00 – Eastern Regions Women's League (Div 1)
2001–02 – Eastern Junior Plate and Herts F.A. Women's Cup
2004–05 – Herts Charity Shield
2008–09 – Herts Charity Shield
2009–10 – South Midland Reserve League Challenge Cup
2010–11 – South Midlands Floodlit Reserve Cup

Former players
1. Players that have played/managed in the Football League or any foreign equivalent to this level (i.e. fully professional league).
2. Players with full international caps.
3. Players that hold a club record or have captained the club.
 Dave Donaldson – (1984–Unknown)
 Will Norris – (2011–2012, 2013)

References

External links
 Official Club Website

 
Football clubs in England
Spartan South Midlands Football League
Football clubs in Hertfordshire
Isthmian League
1875 establishments in England
Association football clubs established in 1875